Trevor James  was the Dean of St Paul's Cathedral, Dunedin, New Zealand, from March 17, 2009 until June 3, 2018. 
James was educated at King's College London. He has taught at universities in Australia, Hong Kong and New Zealand. He was Dean of Theology at the University of Auckland from 1993 until his appointment as Dean.

Notes

Alumni of King's College London
Deans of Dunedin
Academic staff of the University of Auckland
Living people
Year of birth missing (living people)